Ernest Joseph North MM (23 September 1895 – 24 August 1955) was an English professional footballer. North, who played as a centre forward, played for Sheffield United, Arsenal, Reading, Gillingham, Norwich City, Watford and Northfleet United. He was also a professional cricketer for Middlesex.

Career
North's early footballing career was interrupted by World War I, in which he enlisted and served as an acting sergeant in the Royal Engineers and the Machine Gun Corps and then as a lieutenant in the Tank Corps. North won the Military Medal during the conflict. During this time he also featured as a guest player for Sheffield United.

North joined Arsenal in 1919 as an amateur. A centre forward, he scored on his debut in a First Division match against Oldham Athletic on 7 February 1920. However, he was used mainly as backup for Henry White and Fred Pagnam, and made just 23 league appearances (scoring six goals) in three seasons before leaving Highbury for Reading in May 1922.

He later played for Watford, Norwich City and Gillingham. After retiring, he was briefly a coach at Northfleet United. He also played cricket for Middlesex and later became an umpire in the Minor Counties Championship.

References

External links

1895 births
1955 deaths
British Army personnel of World War I
English footballers
Forgemasters Sports & Social F.C. players
Sheffield United F.C. players
Arsenal F.C. players
Reading F.C. players
Gillingham F.C. players
Norwich City F.C. players
Watford F.C. players
Northfleet United F.C. players
English cricketers
Middlesex cricketers
English cricket umpires
Sportspeople from Burton upon Trent
Recipients of the Military Medal
Marylebone Cricket Club cricketers
Machine Gun Corps soldiers
Royal Engineers soldiers
Royal Tank Regiment officers
Association football forwards
Military personnel from Staffordshire